Nitro Rush is a Canadian action drama film, directed by Alain DesRochers and released in 2016. A sequel to his 2007 film Nitro, the film stars Guillaume Lemay-Thivierge reprising his role as Max, who is now in prison for murdering a police officer. One day a mysterious woman (Micheline Lanctôt) shows up to solicit his help in breaking up a criminal gang in which his son Théo (Antoine DesRochers) has gotten involved, leading him to break out of prison and join forces with gang leader Daphné (Madeleine Péloquin) to steal the formula for a new rave drug.

The film opened in theatres on August 31, 2016.

The film received four Prix Iris nominations at the 19th Quebec Cinema Awards in 2017, for Best Art Direction (Dominique Desrochers), Best Cinematography (Tobie Marier Robitaille), Best Makeup (Marlène Rouleau) and Best Sound (Stéphane Bergeron, Martin Desmarais and Marie-Claude Gagné).

References

External links

2016 films
Canadian action drama films
Canadian prison drama films
Films shot in Quebec
Films set in Quebec
Films directed by Alain DesRochers
2016 drama films
2010s prison drama films
French-language Canadian films
2010s Canadian films